No Place to Land is a 1958 American drama film directed by Albert C. Gannaway starring John Ireland, Mari Blanchard, Gail Russell, Jackie Coogan and Robert Middleton. Shot in Naturama, the film was released by Republic Pictures.

A cropduster pilot finds himself caught between two women—one who loves him and the other, who doesn't handle rejection well, who's out to destroy him.

Cast       
John Ireland as Jonas Bailey
Mari Blanchard as Iris Lee LaVonne
Gail Russell as Lynn Dillon
Jackie Coogan as Swede
Robert Middleton as Buck LaVonne
Douglas Henderson as Roy Dillon
Burt Topper as Miles Colby
Bill Ward as Chick
Whitey Hughes as Franklin
Robert Griffin as Bart Pine 
William Peter Blatty as Policeman 
Johnny Carpenter as Lepley 
James Macklin as Dr. Christian Carter
Bill Coontz as Bill
Patrick Dennis-Leigh as Drunk
Robert Hinkle as 'Big Jim'

References

External links 
 

1958 films
American drama films
1958 drama films
Republic Pictures films
1950s English-language films
Films directed by Albert C. Gannaway
1950s American films